Geneva railway station, also known as Geneva Cornavin railway station, is Geneva's main train station, located in the centre of the city. The immediate area surrounding it is known as Cornavin; both names can be used interchangeably.

The third largest train station in Switzerland by passenger numbers, with 116,000 users on average per working day (figures before Léman Express network began full operation), it sees over 400 train departures every day from its eight through-platforms. Platforms 7 and 8 have French and Swiss border controls. Long distance and regional express trains leave for France without making any stops in Switzerland. Another reason to separate the tracks is the different electrical standards of the relevant railway system on either side. The French system uses 25 kV at 50 Hz AC, but the Swiss system uses 15 kV AC at 16.7 Hz.

The station connects to one Swiss mainline, the Lausanne–Geneva line, which links the city with the rest of Switzerland, to the east. Many long-distance trains from this line continue to and terminate at the airport, 6 minutes away. There is also significant traffic to France westwards along the Lyon-Geneva line, which, for the first few kilometres, runs as a single track line alongside the double-track line to the airport. Traffic to France includes long-distance TGVs to Paris and southern France and regional trains to Lyon via Bellegarde. Cornavin is also the hub of the Léman Express network, with six routes in service.

Facilities
The facilities at the station include a police station, a pharmacy, several supermarkets, coffee shops, bakeries, food stands, clothing shops and multiple other establishments.

Nearby area features 
Located directly outside the station are bus and tram stops for Transports Publics Genevois services to all over Geneva city, its canton and nearby French locales, a taxi rank, banks, cash machines, post offices, hotels, cinemas, jewellers, book shops, money exchange services, restaurants, bars, and fast food restaurants.

In popular culture
The station entrance and a platform is seen in The Adventures of Tintin comic The Calculus Affair (1956).

Planned extension of the railway station
The Swiss Federal Railways announced they would extend the railway station by constructing two new railway tracks. The station needs extending due to the planned increase in traffic over the coming years. The initial project cost 800 million Swiss francs and involved the demolition of 350 dwellings next to the station. A second project supported by residents of the neighborhood plans to build the two new tracks under the station with a total cost around 1.7 billion Swiss francs.

The Swiss Federal Rail plans for the new extension to be completed by 2025.

In April 2013, an initiative was launched to claim the extension under the station by the "Collectif 500", a neighborhood association.

Services
 the following services stop at Geneva:

 TGV Lyria:
 service every two hours to Paris-Lyon.
On weekends, hourly service to Geneva Airport.
 Léman Express:
 : service to Bellegarde.

PRODES EA 2035 
As part of the strategic development program for rail infrastructure (PRODES), the Confederation and SBB are focusing on customer orientation and economical management of resources.

By 2040, nearly two million people will travel by rail every day, 50% more than today. In rail freight, the Confederation also expects traffic to increase by around 45%. The Swiss rail network will have to continue to meet customer needs: interesting connections, punctual trains, affordable tickets. SBB is committed to the sustainable development of public transport and takes on this responsibility vis-à-vis Switzerland.

Predicted Services 
The following services will stop from 2035 at Geneva:

 TGV Lyria:
 Service every two hours to Paris-Lyon.
 Three trains per day starting at Lausanne.
 One daily round-trip to Marseille-Saint-Charles in the summer.
 EuroCity: Eight trains per day to Milano Centrale, with two trains continuing from Milano Centrale to Venezia Santa Lucia.
 InterCity: 
 IC1: Hourly service between Geneva Airport and Romanshorn
IC11 (Sister Line): Hourly Service between Geneva Airport and Lucerne
 IC5: Half-hourly service between Geneva Airport and St. Gallen, with every other train continuing to St. Margrethen.
 IC51 (Sister Line): Hourly service between Geneva Airport and Basel SBB
 IC9: Half-hourly service between Geneva Airport and Brig
 InterRegio:
 IR18: Hourly service between Annemasse and Bern
 IR95: Half-Hourly between Geneva Airport and St-Maurice
 IR98: Hourly service between Annemasse and Aigle
 Léman Express:
 : service to Bellegarde.

Gallery

See also

History of rail transport in Switzerland
Rail transport in Switzerland

Notes

References

External links 

 
 Les principaux éléments historiques en relation avec CEVA 

Buildings and structures in Geneva
Railway stations in the canton of Geneva
Swiss Federal Railways stations
Transport in Geneva
Lyon–Geneva railway
Railway stations in Switzerland opened in 1858